Belone Moreira (born 1 June 1990) is a Portuguese handball player for Benfica and the Portuguese national team.

He represented Portugal at the 2020 European Men's Handball Championship.

Honours
Benfica
EHF European League: 2021–22

References

External links

1990 births
Living people
Portuguese male handball players
Sportspeople from Lisbon
S.L. Benfica handball players